Dein Perry is an Australian tap dancer. He is founder of the recurrent tap dance production 'Tap Dogs'. His film credits include work done on the Australian movie Bootmen, as well as choreographic work on Happy Feet 2.

Early life and career
Perry grew up in Newcastle. He received dance lessons from the age of four. He left school at the age of sixteen to work as a Fitter and Turner, before moving to Sydney a year later to pursue dance

Sydney 2000 Olympics Opening Ceremony
Perry choreographed the tap dance segment "Eternity" for the Sydney 2000 Olympics Opening Ceremony. The dance troupe was performed by the Tap Dogs and 1300 Tap Dancers led by Bootmen star Adam Garcia.

Shows
 West Side Story (1980) Dancer
 Paint Your Wagon (1986) Dancer
 Rasputin (1987) Dancer
 My Fair Lady (1989) Dancer
 Man of La Mancha (1990) Dancer
 42nd St (1991) Actor, Dancer
 Hot Shoe Shuffle (1993) Choreographer, Dancer
 Tap Dogs (1995 - Current) Owner, Creator, Director, Choreographer
 Steel City (1998) Creator, Director, Choreographer

Films
 Bootmen (2000) Executive Producer, Director, Choreographer, Actor
 Happy Feet 2 (2011) Tap Choreographer
 Dhoom 3 (2013) Tap Choreographer

Award
Perry won the Laurence Olivier Award for two consecutive years (in 1995 and 1996). At the time he was the youngest person to do so. 

|-
| rowspan=1 | 1994
| Best Short Program (Tap Dogs)
| Video Dance Festival of Strasbourg Prize
| 
|-
| rowspan=7 | 1995
| Best Theatre Choreographer (with David Atkins for Hot Shoe Shuffle)
| Laurence Olivier Theatre Award  
| 
|-
| Best Supporting Role (Hot Shoe Shuffle)
| Green Room Awards (Melbourne)
| 
|-
| Best Original Choreography (Hot Shoe Shuffle)
| Green Room Awards
| 
|-
| Outstanding Production at the Edinburgh Festival (Tap Dogs)
| Glasgow Herald Angel Award
| 
|- 
| Dance Performer of the Year 
| Australian Green Room Award
| 
|-
| Best Performance by an Ensemble Cast (Tap Dogs)
| Australian Green Room Award
| 
|-
| Excellence in Live Performance (Tap Dogs)
| Australian Green Room Award
| 
|-
| rowspan=5 | 1996
| Best Choreographer (Tap Dogs) 
| Laurence Olivier Theatre Award  
| 
|-
| Best New Production Off Broadway Theatre 1996 (Tap Dogs)
| NY Obie Award
| 
|-
| Dance Performer of the Year 
| Mo Awards
| 
|-
| Best Original Choreography (Tap Dogs)
| Green Room Awards
| 
|-
| Outstanding Contribution to Musical Theatre (Tap Dogs)
| Mo Awards
| 
|-
| rowspan=6 | 1997
| Outstanding Choreography (Tap Dogs)
| Drama Desk Awards 
| 
|-
| Dance Performer of the Year  
| Mo Awards
| 
|-
| Most Popular Production at The Spoleto Festival (Tap Dogs)
| Pegasus Award 
| 
|-
| Entertainer of the Year 
| Variety Heart Award
| 
|-
| Australian Show Business Ambassador of the Year 1997
| Mo Awards
| 
|-
| Australian Performer of the Year
| Mo Awards
| 
|-
| rowspan=3 | 1998
| Best Choreography (Tap Dogs)
| Australian Dance Awards
| 
|-
| Dance Performer of the Year
| Mo Awards
| 
|-
| Show Business Ambassador of the Year (Tap Dogs)
| Mo Awards
| 
|-
| 2000
| Best Film (Bootmen)
| AFI Awards
| 
|-
| rowspan=3 |2005 
| Outstanding Performance by a Male Dancer 
| Australian Dance Awards
| 
|-
| Best Male Dancer in a Dance Work 
| Helpman Awards
| 
|-
| Best Special Event Tap Dogs 10 Year Anniversary 
| Helpman Awards
| 
|-
| rowspan=2 | 2013
| Outstanding Performance in Commercial Dance or Musical Theatre (Tap Dogs)
| Australian Dance Awards (Tap Dogs)
| 
|-
| Best Original Choreography (Hot Shoe Shuffle)
| Green Room Awards
|
|}

References

External links
 
 
 HLA Management Australia biography
 Tap Dogs website

 

Year of birth missing (living people)
Living people
Australian choreographers
Australian male dancers
Australian film directors
Australian theatre directors
Laurence Olivier Award winners
Male actors from New South Wales